Madhukar Katre (born 5 February 1927, Pune, d. 16 January 2009, Ahmednagar) was an Indian politician and trade unionist. Katre joined the freedom struggle during his school days in Kolhapur. He later became a communist and an activist of the Praja Parishad ('People's Assembly', an organization that struggled for the abolition of the Kolhapur Princely State). As a result, from his activist, he was imprisoned for seventeen months.

Katre was a leading figure in the trade union movement. He was General Secretary of the Maharashtra Rajya Sahakari Kamgar Mahasangh, a union of sugar plantation workers. He also led sugar-producing cooperatives in the state. Katre had also been active in movements such as Samyukta Maharashtra (the struggle for a Marathi-speaking state), Goa liberation and the struggle for implementation of the Maharashtra land tenancy legislation.

Politically, Katre had been a leading member of the Lal Nishan Party. After the 1989 split in the party, he became the President of the Lal Nishan Party (Leninvadi).

References

1927 births
2009 deaths
Indian communists
Trade unionists from Maharashtra
Marathi politicians
Maharashtra politicians